Droom Technology Limited is an Indian company that maintains an online marketplace for buying and selling used and new automobiles. Founded in April 2014, the company is based in Gurugram, Haryana and also operates in Singapore, Thailand, and Malaysia, besides 1,161 Indian town and cities. In July 2021, Droom became Unicorn after raising $200 Mn in a pre-IPO funding round at a valuation of $1.2 billion.

History 
Sandeep Aggarwal, who previously co-founded ShopClues together with Sanjay Sethi and Radhika Aggarwal, founded Droom with Rishab Malik in April 2014. The company was incorporated on 9 September, 2014, and first launched in Delhi on 21 November 2014 as a platform for used cars. Later, the company also added the buying and selling features for used cars and two-wheelers on its site and by 2015, it had operations in 100 cities across India.

In 2016, the company entererd into a partnership with CashCare and incorporatd the Orange Book value pricing engine into its platform that helps in determining the fair market value of used automobiles. In December of the same year, the company introduced Droom History, a national repository for vehicle history which provides used vehicle history by generating a vehicle history report.

In 2017, the company launched Droom Credit for auto financing, Droom Discovery for vehicle research, and ECO in 2019 for vehicle inspection.

In 2018, Droom became the official sponsor of the MTV reality TV show Roadies’ 16th edition. In October, the company launched its platform in Malaysia, Singapore in December, and Thailand in April 2019. 

In December 2018, the company acquired Xeraphin Finvest in an all-cash deal. In March 2020, the company launched its Droom Health with Germ Shield sanitization services to make vehicles virus-proof. In April 2020 it extended its Germ Shield technology to Gurugram police to sanitize its fleet of vehicles. In October, Droom acquired Delhi-NCR-based AR startup Visiolab Ideas for an undisclosed amount.

Initial public offering (IPO) 
In November 2021, the company announced that it had filed for an IPO to raise up to Rs 3000 crore (around $361.296 million) and listing on Nasdaq, but withdrew its filing a year later in 2022, citing market conditions.

Finances 
In 2015, Droom raised $16 million from Lightbox Ventures, followed by its Series B funding for an undisclosed sum led by Singapore-based investor Beenext and Japanese incubator and venture capital firm Digital Garage. In July 2017, the company raised $20 million in Series C funding round from Integrated Asset Management and existing investor Digital Garage. In 2018, it secured $30  million in funding for a Series D round led by Toyota Tsusho Corporation of Toyota Group and co-led by Digital Garage. The company raised $30 Mn in series E funding round. Droom raised $10 Million as part of a series F round of funding in 2019 from its Singapore Based holding entity.

In July 2021, the company raised $200 million in Pre-IPO round funding led by 57 Stars and Seven Train Ventures.

Controversy 
In 2018, Cyber Security Researcher Sayaan Alam found a vulnerability in Droom API-vulnerability that exposed users' data like addresses, PAN cards, banking details, etc. Droom fixed the issue in December 2018.

In 2013, the company founder, Sandeep Agarwal was charged by the United States Department of Justice (DoJ) and U.S. Securities and Exchange Commission (SEC) for insider trading when he was a Wall Street analyst. In February 2020 all the charges were dropped by DoJ against him. SEC also reached a settlement with Sandeep.

References 

Companies based in Delhi
Online marketplaces of India
Internet properties established in 2014